Ronan Wallace is a Gaelic footballer who plays for the Multyfarnham club and at senior level for the Westmeath county team.

He was a member of the team that defeated Dublin at Parnell Park in the 2019 O'Byrne Cup final, his county's first time to win that trophy since 1988. He won his second piece of silverware of 2019 when Westmeath won the 2019 National Football League Division 3 league title by a goal against Laois at Croke Park, Wallace scored 0–1.

He scored the first goal against Offaly in the 2022 Tailteann Cup semi-final, which Westmeath won to qualify for the competition's inaugural final. Then he got the insurance score in that one to down Cavan.

Honours
Westmeath
 Tailteann Cup (1): 2022
 National Football League Division 3 (1): 2019
 O'Byrne Cup (1): 2019

Individual
 Tailteann Cup Team of the Year (1): 2022

References

Year of birth missing (living people)
Living people
Multyfarnham Gaelic footballers
Westmeath inter-county Gaelic footballers